The Bornean tiger or Borneo tiger is possibly an extinct tiger population that lived on the island of Borneo in prehistoric times. 
A live Bornean tiger has not been conclusively recorded, but the indigenous Dayak people believe in its existence, and occasionally report sightings.

Characteristics 
It has been assumed that the Bornean tiger might have been rather small in size, similar to the Sumatran tiger. According to the native people, it is bigger than a Bornean clouded leopard, and largely brown in colour with faint stripes.

In Malaysia's Sarawak, about 750,000 animal bone fragments were excavated in Niah National Park between 1954 and 1966. Two fossil bone fragments excavated at the Ille Cave on the island of Palawan in the Philippines were identified as being of a tiger. These lengths are similar to those of living tigers from the Malay Peninsula and India.

Behaviour and ecology 
The Borneo tiger is thought to have preyed on ungulate species such as the Bornean bearded pig, the Bornean yellow muntjac and the sambar deer. According to the local Dayak, the tiger did not climb trees.

Archaeological records 

Archaeological excavations produced an upper canine tooth, a navicular and a metacarpal bone that were identified as being of a tiger. It has therefore been suggested that the tiger was present in Borneo during the late Pleistocene and early Holocene. A bone fragment was also found in the Philippine island of Palawan. Archaeologists considered it unlikely that these fragments were traded between different regions during the Pleistocene.

Borneo might have been connected to Palawan during the penultimate and previous glacial periods, judging from the molecular phylogeny of murids in the area. Tiger parts were commonly used as amulets in South and Southeast Asia, so it is possible that the tiger parts found in Palawan were imported from elsewhere.

It is also possible that the tiger crossed the Balabac Strait in the Middle Pleistocene, about 420,000–620,000 years ago, when the distance between Borneo and Palawan was shorter, and the sea level was lower, than today. During this period, the relative sea level decreased to about  due to the expansion of ice sheets. To date, no evidence exists for the tiger surviving in Palawan beyond 12,000 years ago.

Alleged records 
In 1975, Douchan Gersi claimed to have seen a tiger in East Kalimantan, Indonesia. He took two photographs of the animal. These photos depict a tiger, but the authenticity of the photographs was doubted, and its origin remains unclear. It might have been an escaped captive animal. In 1995, native people in Central Kalimantan claimed to have heard a tiger roar, and that they were able to distinguish between a tiger's roar and vocalisations of other animals.

In culture 

Natives of Borneo keep the memory of the tiger alive in their culture by treating its body parts as heirlooms; therefore, it has been suggested that the Bornean tiger survived longer than prehistoric times. Tiger claws were used as protective amulets among the Kenyah, Ngaju and Iban peoples, possibly for important ceremonies or to be worn by individuals of prominent status; vocabulary referring to the animal's  presence (but also in avoidance speech) is also attested, such as aso for 'dog' or buang / bohang for 'bear', as a replacement in Kayanic languages.

Tiger motifs are also seen depicted in traditional, ceremonial and modern carvings; additionally, tigers can be seen on weaved fabrics, such as mats and clothing, like the Iban pua kumbu.

See also 
 Sunda Islands
 Greater islands
 Brunei
 Kalimantan, Indonesia
 Sabah, Malaysia
 Lesser islands

 Tiger populations
 Mainland Asian populations
 Bengal tiger
 Caspian tiger
 Indochinese tiger
 Malayan tiger
 Siberian tiger
 South China tiger
 Sunda island populations
 Bali tiger
 Javan tiger
 Sumatran tiger

References

External links 
 Was Borneo once a land of tigers (Mongabay)

Tigers
Carnivorans of Malaysia
Mammals of Indonesia